Hypoplasia (from Ancient Greek   'under' +   'formation'; adjective form hypoplastic) is underdevelopment or incomplete development of a tissue or organ.  Although the term is not always used precisely, it properly refers to an inadequate or below-normal number of cells.  Hypoplasia is similar to aplasia, but less severe. It is technically not the opposite of hyperplasia (too many cells). Hypoplasia is a congenital condition, while hyperplasia generally refers to excessive cell growth later in life.  (Atrophy, the wasting away of already existing cells, is technically the direct opposite of both hyperplasia and hypertrophy.)

Hypoplasia can be present in any tissue or organ. It is descriptive of many medical conditions, including underdevelopment of organs such as:
 Breasts during puberty
 Testes in Klinefelter's syndrome
 Ovaries in Fanconi anemia, gonadal dysgenesis, trisomy X
 Thymus in DiGeorge syndrome
 Labia majora in popliteal pterygium syndrome
 Corpus callosum, connecting the two sides of the brain, in agenesis of the corpus callosum
 Cerebellum caused by mutation in the reelin gene
 Tooth caused by oral pathology, such as Turner's hypoplasia
 Chambers of the heart in hypoplastic left heart syndrome and hypoplastic right heart syndrome
 Optic nerve in optic nerve hypoplasia
 Sacrum in sacral agenesis
 Facial muscle in asymmetric crying facies
 Thumb from birth
 Lungs, often as a result of oligohydramnios during gestation or the existence of congenital diaphragmatic hernia
 Small bowel in coeliac disease
 Fingers and ears in harlequin-type ichthyosis
 Mandible in congenital hypothyroidism

See also 
 Atrophy, when an existing part wastes away
 List of biological development disorders

References 

Medical terminology
Anatomical pathology